I Let The Music Speak is a compilation album by Swedish singer Anne Sofie von Otter.

Track listing
1. The Day Before You Came - 05:10
Benny Andersson - writing
Björn Ulvaeus - writing
Anne Sofie von Otter - vocals
Georg Wadenius - guitars
Fleshquartet - arrangements, strings & percussion

2. I Let The Music Speak - 05:00
Benny Andersson - writing
Björn Ulvaeus - writing
Anne Sofie von Otter - vocals
Georg Wadenius - guitar, arrangements
Anders Eljas - arrangements
Fredrik Jonsson - acoustic bass
Magnus Persson - drums & percussion
Jörgen Stenberg - vibraphone
Mikael Augustsson - accordion
David Björkman - violin
Roland Kress - violin
Jakob Ruthberg - viola
Anna Wallgren - cello
Magnus Lindgren - flute

3. When All Is Said And Done - 03:32
Benny Andersson - writing
Björn Ulvaeus - writing
Anne Sofie von Otter - vocals
Georg Wadenius - guitar & arrangements
Fredrik Jonsson - acoustic bass
Magnus Persson - drums
Jörgen Stenberg - vibraphone
Lasse Englund - Dobro guitar
Kalle Moraeus - violin

4. I Walk With You, Mama - 03:31
Benny Andersson - writing, piano & arrangements
Björn Ulvaeus - writing
Anne Sofie von Otter - vocals
Svante Henryson - arrangements & acoustic bass

5. The Winner Takes It All - 04:00
Benny Andersson - writing
Björn Ulvaeus - writing
Anne Sofie von Otter - vocals
Anders Eljas - arrangements
Georg Wadenius - arrangements, guitars & electric piano
Fredrik Jonsson - acoustic bass
Magnus Persson - drums
Jörgen Stenberg - vibraphone
David Björkman - violin
Roland Kress - violin
Jakob Ruthberg - viola
Anna Wallgren - cello

6. Butterfly Wings - 03:42
Benny Andersson - writing
Björn Ulvaeus - writing
Anne Sofie von Otter - vocals
Anders Eljas - arrangements, piano
Georg Wadenius - guitars
Fredrik Jonsson - acoustic bass
Magnus Persson - percussion
Anna Wallgren - cello

7. Heaven Help My Heart (from the musical Chess) - 03:17
Benny Andersson - writing
Björn Ulvaeus - writing
Tim Rice - writing
Anne Sofie von Otter - vocals
Anders Eljas - arrangements, piano
Georg Wadenius - arrangements, guitar
Fredrik Jonsson - acoustic bass
Magnus Persson - percussion
Jörgen Stenberg - vibraphone
David Björkman - violin
Roland Kress - violin
Jakob Ruthberg - viola
Anna Wallgren - cello
Magnus Lindgren - bass clarinet

8. Ljusa kvällar om våren (from the musical Kristina från Duvemåla) - 04:37
Benny Andersson - writing
Björn Ulvaeus - writing
Anne Sofie von Otter - vocals
Anders Eljas - arrangements, piano
Georg Wadenius - arrangements, guitar & scat vocals
Fredrik Jonsson - acoustic bass
Magnus Persson - drums
Jörgen Stenberg - percussion

9. I Am Just A Girl - 03:14
Benny Andersson - writing
Björn Ulvaeus - writing
Stig Anderson - writing
Anne Sofie von Otter - vocals
Georg Wadenius - arrangements & guitar
Anders Eljas - piano
Fredrik Jonsson - acoustic bass
Magnus Persson - drums & percussion
Lasse Englund - Dobro guitar
Kalle Moraeus - banjo
Karl Jakobsson - tuba
Pär Grebacken - clarinet

10. Ut mot ett hav (from the musical Kristina från Duvemåla) - 05:15
Benny Andersson - writing
Björn Ulvaeus - writing
Anne Sofie von Otter - vocals
Georg Wadenius - arrangements, guitars, keyboards & drum programming
Fredrik Jonsson - electric bass
Magnus Persson - drums & percussion
Jörgen Stenberg - vibraphone & marimba
Magnus Lindgren - soprano saxophone

11. After The Rain (Efter regnet) - 02:54
Benny Andersson - writing, arrangements & piano
Mats Nörklit - writing
Anne Sofie von Otter - vocals

12. Money, Money, Money - 03:31
Benny Andersson - writing
Björn Ulvaeus - writing
Anne Sofie von Otter - vocals
Mikael Augustsson - accordion
David Björkman - violin
Anders Eljas - arrangements, piano
Pär Grebacken - clarinet
Fredrik Jonsson - acoustic bass
Roland Kress - violin
Magnus Persson - drums & percussion
Jakob Ruthberg - viola
Jörgen Stenberg - vibraphone
Anna Wallgren - cello

Crew 
Recording: Stockholm, Atlantis Studio, 9/2004
Executive Producer: Dr. Marion Thiem
Project Manager: Valérie Gross
Recording Producer: Georg Wadenius
Balance Engineer: Janne Hansson
Production Coordinator: Margaretha Söderling
Publisher: Universal/Union Songs AB (1,2,3,5,9); Mono Music AB (4,6,8,11); Mono Music AB/Kopparnäset Forlags AB (10); Three Knights Ltd. (7)
Booklet Editor: Eva Zöllner
Colour photos (front & back cover & inside booklet): Thomas Klementsson
Black & white photos (session photos): Mats Bäcker
Design: Klasse 3b
Art Direction: Merle Kersten

Charts

References 

Anne Sofie von Otter albums
2006 albums
Deutsche Grammophon albums